Jesús "El Tuto" Olmos Moreno (20 July 1910 – 25 October 1988) was a Mexican basketball player who competed in the 1936 Summer Olympics. Born in Chihuahua, he was part of the Mexican basketball team, which won the bronze medal. He played all seven matches.

References

External links
 
XI JUEGOS OLIMPICOS BERLIN 1936 BRONCE | EQUIPO DE BALONCESTO 

1910 births
1998 deaths
Basketball players at the 1936 Summer Olympics
Mexican men's basketball players
Olympic basketball players of Mexico
Olympic bronze medalists for Mexico
Basketball players from Chihuahua
People from Chihuahua City
Olympic medalists in basketball
Medalists at the 1936 Summer Olympics